The 2021–22 USC Trojans men's basketball team represented the University of Southern California during the 2021–22 NCAA Division I men's basketball season. The Trojans are led by 9th-year head coach Andy Enfield and played their home games at the Galen Center for the 16th season in Los Angeles, California as members of the Pac-12 Conference. They finished the season 26–8, 14–6 in Pac-12 Play to finish in third place. As the No. 3 seed in the Pac-12 tournament, they defeated Washington in the quarterfinals before losing in the semifinals to UCLA. They received an at-large bid to the NCAA tournament as the No. 7 seed in the Midwest Region, where they lost in the First Round to Miami (FL).

Previous season

The USC Trojans finished the 2020–21 season with a 25–8 overall record, and a 15–5 conference record. They finished in second place in the Pac-12 Conference. They were a part of the Pac-12 tournament they played against the Utah in the Quarterfinals and won in 2OT by the score of 91–85, they would move on to the semifinals but would lose to Colorado and would be eliminated from the tournament. They would then be invited to compete in the 2021 NCAA tournament and would get wins against Drake, Kansas, Oregon, but would then be eliminated by the Gonzaga Bulldogs in the Elite Eight.

Off-season

Departures

Incoming transfers

2021 recruiting class

2022 Recruiting class

Roster

Schedule and results

|-
!colspan=9 style=| Regular season

|-
!colspan=9 style=| Pac-12 Tournament

|-
!colspan=9 style=| NCAA tournament

 
Source:

Game summaries

Cal State Northridge Matadors vs USC Trojans

USC Trojans vs Temple Owls

No. 25 USC Trojans vs Florida Gulf Coast Eagles

Dixie State Trailblazers vs No. 24 USC Trojans

No.24 USC Trojans vs Saint Joseph's Hawks

No. 24 USC Trojans vs San Diego State Aztecs

Utah Runnin' Utes vs No. 20 USC Trojans

No. 20 USC Trojans vs Washington State Cougars

Eastern Kentucky Colonels vs No. 16 USC Trojans

Long Beach State vs No. 16 USC Trojans

UC Irvine Anteaters vs No. 10 USC Trojans

Georgia Tech Yellow Jackets vs No. 10 USC Trojans

Oklahoma State 
 Notes: Game with Oklahoma State on December 21 was Canceled due to COVID-19 Issues.

Arizona State and No. 9 Arizona 
 Notes: Games with Arizona State on December 30 and No. 9 Arizona on January 2 were postponed due to COVID-19 Issues and will be rescheduled.

No. 7 USC Trojans vs California Golden Bears

No. 5 USC Trojans vs Stanford Cardinal

Oregon State Beavers vs No. 5 USC Trojans

Oregon Ducks vs No. 5 USC Trojans

No. 16 USC Trojans vs Colorado Buffaloes

No. 16 USC Trojans vs Utah Runnin' Utes

Arizona State Sun Devils vs USC Trojans

Stanford Cardinal vs USC Trojans

California Golden Bears vs USC Trojans

USC Trojans vs Arizona State Sun Devils

USC Trojans vs Arizona Wildcats

UCLA Bruins vs USC Trojans

Washington Huskies vs USC Trojans

Washington State Cougars vs USC Trojans

USC Trojans vs Oregon State Beavers

USC Trojans vs Oregon Ducks

USC Trojans vs UCLA Bruins

Pac-12 Conference tournament Game Summary

TBD

Rankings

*AP does not release post-NCAA Tournament rankings.^Coaches did not release a Week 1 poll.

References

USC Trojans men's basketball seasons
USC
USC Trojans basketball, men
USC Trojans basketball, men
USC Trojans basketball, men
USC Trojans basketball, men
USC